William Preston Miller (February 22, 1930 – October 27, 2016) was an American athlete who competed mainly in the javelin throw. He competed for the United States in the 1952 Summer Olympics held in Helsinki, Finland in the javelin throw where he won the silver medal. Miller was born in Lawnside, New Jersey.

July 1970 Miller returned to competing and placed second in the Javelin at the 1970 Masters National Outdoor Track and Field Championship.

References

Bill Miller's obituary

1930 births
2016 deaths
American male javelin throwers
Olympic silver medalists for the United States in track and field
Athletes (track and field) at the 1952 Summer Olympics
Medalists at the 1952 Summer Olympics
American masters athletes